Andrew Moodie (born November 30, 1966) is a Canadian actor and playwright. He is most noted for his plays Riot, which was a winner of the Floyd S. Chalmers Canadian Play Award in 1996, and Toronto the Good, which was a Dora Mavor Moore Award nominee for Best Original Play (General Theatre) in 2009.

Early life
Born and raised in Ottawa, Ontario, he is the brother of actress Tanya Moodie.

Career
Moodie began his career as an actor with Ottawa's Great Canadian Theatre Company in the 1980s.

His other plays have included Oui (1998), Wilbur County Blues (1998), A Common Man's Guide to Loving Women (1999), The Lady Smith (2000) and The Real McCoy (2006). He was also a writer of the CBC Radio drama series Afghanada.

As an actor, Moodie is best known for his recurring supporting roles as Simon Frontenac in Orphan Black and Teku Fonsei in Dark Matter. He won a Dora Award in the Youth Theatre division for his performance in David S. Craig and Robert Morgan's Health Class, and was nominated in the Independent division in 2003 for his performance in Othello.

From 2006 to 2011 Moodie was the host of TVOntario's documentary series Big Ideas.

References

External links

1966 births
Living people
20th-century Canadian male actors
20th-century Canadian male writers
20th-century Canadian dramatists and playwrights
21st-century Canadian male actors
21st-century Canadian male writers
21st-century Canadian dramatists and playwrights
Canadian male film actors
Canadian male stage actors
Canadian male Shakespearean actors
Canadian male television actors
Canadian male dramatists and playwrights
Canadian theatre directors
Black Canadian male actors
Black Canadian writers
Male actors from Ottawa
Writers from Ottawa